Benton is an unincorporated community in Benton Township, Elkhart County, Indiana.

History
Benton was platted in 1832. It was named in honor of politician Thomas Hart Benton.

The railroad was built through Benton in 1892. A post office was established at Benton in 1835, and remained in operation until it was discontinued in 1963.

Geography

References

Unincorporated communities in Elkhart County, Indiana
Unincorporated communities in Indiana

ro:Fowler, Indiana